This is a list of cities in Asia that have several names in different languages, including former names. Many cities have different names in different languages. Some cities have also undergone name changes for political or other reasons.

This article does not offer any opinion about what the "original", "official", "real", or "correct" name of any city is or was. Cities are listed alphabetically by their current best-known name in English. The English version is followed by variants in other languages, in alphabetical order by name including any historical variants and former names.
lu
Foreign names that are the same as their English equivalents may be listed.

Note: The blue asterisks generally indicate the availability of a Wikipedia article in that language for that city; it also provides additional reference for the equivalence. Red asterisks or a lack of an asterisk indicate that no such article exists, and that these equivalents without further footnotes should be viewed with caution.



A

B

C

D

E

F

G

H

I

J

K

L

M

N

O

P

Q

R

S

T

U

V

X

Y

Z

See also

Notes

References

Asian cities
Asian cities
Asian cities
Asian cities
 *
Cities